Supreme Guard Command (also known as Unit 963, the Escort Bureau, Guard Command, Guard Bureau and the General Guard Bureau) is the personal bodyguard force tasked with the protection of North Korea's ruling Kim family. The current Supreme Guard commander is General Yun Jong-rin.

Naming
North Korea's ruling family are claimed to be superstitious and so the Command's designation number is in reference to the numerological construct "9 and 6+3=9" (double nine), the number "9" being considered lucky.

History
According to official history, the Command participated in the Korean War (known in North Korea as the "Fatherland Liberation War"). The unit has also produced 72 "heroes of labor" and 28 "heroes of the Republic".

The first incarnation of the Command was created in 1946. Between 1970-mid 1990s the Command was part of the State Security Department. However, to deal with several coup attempts, Kim Jong-il reorganized the Guard by dismissing dozens of officers and expanding his own private bodyguard unit by 200 men and named it the "2.16 Unit".

On April 27, 2018, the SGC was deployed to protect Kim Jong-un during his visit to Panmunjon.

Organization
The Command falls under the Korean People's Army Ground Force and is divided into approximately six departments, three combat brigades, several bodyguard divisions, and one construction battalion. The unit is composed of 95,000-120,000 personnel.

Bodyguard divisions are divided into at least two sections, Section 1 was dedicated to the protection of Kim Il-sung and Section 2 protected Kim Jong-il. It is unknown if Kim Jong-un has a new dedicated section.

The Command has camps located throughout the country, usually near official residences, and has a strong presence in Pyongyang. The Command also monitors key military and party figures to ensure the safety of the Kim family. It also coordinates with the Pyongyang Defense Command (with its 70,000 men) and III Corps (North Korea) for the defense of the capital and other strategic locations. These other military units provide an additional 95,000-100,000 soldiers, plus artillery and armored vehicles, for the defense of the country's leadership.

Recruitment and training
According to the testimonies of North Korean defector Lee Young-kuk, recruiters for the Guard look for new recruits in high schools where students are lined up for inspection. Physical prerequisites include, no facial scars and a well-proportioned body. Potential candidates have their family histories scrutinized for party loyalty and good "songbun". Once chosen, they are given an ID number while all other records are erased; contact with family is forbidden. Only one member per family is allowed to serve as a bodyguard.

Recruits are then taken to special training camps for six months and are trained for a total of two years. Training includes, Taekwondo classes, marksmanship, 25 km marches in full gear and special operations tactics. According to defector Oh Young-nam, a former member of the State Security Department, the Supreme Guard Command published a 300-page training book detailing previous security incidents.

Commanders
Ri Ul-sol - 1996-2003
Yun Jong-rin - 2003-2020
Kwak Chang-sik (곽창식)- 2020

Known members
 Lee Young-kuk
 Pak Su-hyon

References

Bibliography

External links
 Guard Command, North Korea Leadership Watch

Protective security units
Military units and formations of North Korea